Time of Orchids was an American, New York City-based experimental rock band founded in 1999 and disbanded in 2007.

Two of the band's albums feature renowned female vocalists. Kate Pierson (of The B-52's) performs on "Much Too Much Fun" while Julee Cruise of Twin Peaks fame sings on "Sarcast While".

The album, Sarcast While was released on John Zorn's Tzadik record label.

Line up

Last line-up
Chuck Stern- Vocals, Keyboards.
Eric Fitzgerald- Guitar, Vocals.
Jesse Krakow- Bass
David Bodie- Drums

Former members
Keith Abrams- Drums
Charlie Looker- Guitar
Will Redmond- Guitar

Guest vocalists
Kate Pierson
Julee Cruise

Discography
Melonwhisper (Relapse Records/Aquarius Records 2001)
Much Too Much Fun (2003)
Early As Seen In Pace (Epicene Sound Systems 2003)
Sarcast While (Tzadik 2006)
Namesake Caution (Cuneiform Records 2007)
In Due Time (Time of Orchids 2010)

External links
Time of Orchids official website
Time of Orchids on Last.fm
Time of Orchids on MySpace
Cuneiform Records
Interview with Chuck Stern
Namesake Caution reviews 1
[ Time Of Orchids on All Music]

American experimental rock groups
Rock music groups from New York (state)
Musical groups from New York City
Relapse Records artists
Cuneiform Records artists
Tzadik Records artists